The 1949–50 season was the 47th season of competitive football in Belgium. RSC Anderlechtois won their 3rd Premier Division title.
The Belgium national football team withdrew from the 1950 FIFA World Cup qualification but played 8 friendly games, winning 5.

Overview
At the end of the season, R Stade Louvain and K Lyra were relegated to Division I, while Daring Club de Bruxelles SR (Division I A winner) and Beringen FC (Division I B winner) were promoted to the Premier Division.
Gosselies Sports, UR Namur, FC Winterslag and FC Verbroedering Geel were relegated from Division I to Promotion, to be replaced by FC Izegem, KAV Dendermonde, K Tubantia FC and Helzold FC Zolder.

National team

* Belgium score given first

Key
 H = Home match
 A = Away match
 N = On neutral ground
 F = Friendly
 o.g. = own goal

Honours

Final league tables

Premier Division

Top scorer: Joseph Mermans (RSC Anderlecht) with 37 goals.

References